Wreckless may refer to:

Wreckless: The Yakuza Missions, a video driving game set in Hong Kong
Wreckless (film), a 1935 American film directed by William A. Shilling